Invisible Mom is a 1996 American comedy film about a mother who becomes invisible.

The film features a cameo from John Ashley.

Plot

A family's life is thrown into comical chaos after mom accidentally drinks her inventor husband's latest concoction, an invisibility potion.

Cast
 Dee Wallace as Laura Griffin
 Barry Livingston as Professor Karl Griffin

References

Sources
  independent review
  independent review

External links

1997 films
1997 comedy films
American comedy films
Films set in the 1960s
Films about invisibility
Films directed by Fred Olen Ray
1990s English-language films
1990s American films